Vibes is privately held company that mobile marketing products and services, such as text message marketing (SMS and MMS), mobile wallet marketing, push notifications, and mobile web experiences. It is based in Chicago, Illinois.

Technology

In 2011, Vibes coined the term "Mobile Relationship Management," a framework to help marketers personalize mobile content for their customers. Vibes uses its platform Catapult to manage these relationships.

In 2013, the company launched Wallet Manager, which lets company create and manage mobile wallet campaigns using Apple's Passbook and Google Wallet.

At the 2013 Google I/O developer conference, Vibes was introduced as one of the first Google Wallet Objects API integration partners.

In 2014, the company launched Vibes Connect, making Tier 1 mobile messaging aggregation services available to everyone.

In February 2015, Vibes announced WalletAds, a new product that enables advertisers to integrate with Apple's Passbook and Google Wallet. This allows consumers to save branded coupons and offers to their Passbook and Google Wallet apps, directly from a mobile banner ad.

History

Jack Philbin and Alex Campbell founded Vibes in 1998. Vibes began as a free pager service supported by advertisements. With the growth of mobile phones in the early 2000s, the company pivoted to becoming a marketing tool that allows customers to interact instantly with advertisers. AT&T was the first carrier to sign with Vibes in 2001.

In 2002, the company completed 100 Text-2-Screen events, the first campaign of its kind in the U.S., at various professional sporting venues.

In 2008, the company raised a $15 million Series A round, led by Fidelity Ventures.

In 2010, the company sent its 1 billionth text message.

In April 2013, Vibes was named in Gartner Research's "Cool Vendors in Mobile Marketing" report.

In July 2013, Vibes acquired Lumata an international provider of mobile marketing software and services to operators, brands and advertisers worldwide.

In March 2015, Vibes and Adobe announced a partnership to integrate mobile wallet technology into the Adobe Marketing Cloud. The integration enables digital marketers using Adobe Marketing Cloud to integrate mobile wallet offerings with Passbook and Google Wallet, along with SMS and Push messaging into their marketing campaigns 

In June 2016, Syniverse, a Tampa, Fl. based company that offers mobile technology for telecommunications companies and other businesses, made a $45 million investment in Vibes giving them a minority stake in the company.

In December 2016, Vibes acquired Miami based Red Fish Media, a mobile marketing and digital solutions company.  Red Fish Media has developed a suite of proprietary products that are designed to work with clients in the healthcare industry.

In 2021, Vibes partnered with Sparkfly to create a mobile marketing attribution solution. This solution allows merchants to segment and retarget customers.

References

Mobile marketing
Text messaging
Companies based in Chicago